Joe Dubuque (born May 17, 1982) is an American amateur wrestler commonly referred to as "The Champ". He was originally from New Jersey.

Dubuque attended Glen Ridge High School in Glen Ridge, Essex County, New Jersey, where he was a two-time state champion wrestler. Competing for Indiana University, Dubuque won an NCAA Division I wrestling title at 125 pounds in 2005, beating Kyle Ott of the University of Illinois 2–0.

In 2006, he repeated as champion, beating Troy Nickerson of Cornell University. Dubuque was also an All-American in 2004, wrestling back from a preliminary round pin.

Dubuque also won two New Jersey state wrestling championships in high school and won the 119-pound national high school wrestling championship in 2001. Dubuque is the first wrestler in Indiana University history to be a two-time national champion.

Dubuque was the assistant wrestling coach for Hofstra University wrestling team from 2007 to 2009. Dubuque then returned to Bloomington as an assistant coach for Indiana University for the 2010 season. In 2012, Dubuque returned to New Jersey to be an assistant coach at Princeton University.

Dubuque earned a bachelor's degree in recreation sports management from Indiana.

References

1982 births
Living people
American male sport wrestlers
Glen Ridge High School alumni
Indiana Hoosiers wrestlers
Hofstra University people
People from Glen Ridge, New Jersey
Sportspeople from Essex County, New Jersey